WASP-8b is an extrasolar planet orbiting the star WASP-8A in the constellation of Sculptor. The star is similar to the Sun and forms a binary star with a Red dwarf star (WASP-8B) of half the Sun's mass that orbits WASP-8A 4.5 arcseconds away. The planet and its parent star were discovered in the SuperWASP batch -6b to -15b. On 1 April 2008, Dr. Don Pollacco of Queen's University Belfast announced them at the RAS National Astronomy Meeting (NAM 2008).

Orbit
The planet orbits WASP-8A at an average distance of just  and a year passes in slightly more than 8.1 days on WASP-8b, which is somewhat farther from its parent star than other hot Jupiter planets. However, WASP-8b's orbit also has an relatively high eccentricity of 0.3, which, at periastron, brings it as close to its star as said similar planets are.

One thing that stands out extremely about WASP-8b is its orbit-spin angle to its star of : This implies that the planet actually orbits retrograde to the spin of the parent star.

Physical characteristics
WASP-8b belongs to a class of extrasolar planets known as hot Jupiters and has a mass about 2.2 times and a radius slightly bigger than that of the planet Jupiter.

See also
 Wide Angle Search for Planets

References

External links

WASP Planets
http://exoplanet.eu/planet.php?p1=WASP-8&p2=b

Exoplanets discovered by WASP
Transiting exoplanets
Hot Jupiters
Giant planets
Exoplanets discovered in 2008
Sculptor (constellation)

de:WASP-8 b